Zeeman textielSupers B.V. (stylized as ZEEMAN) is a Dutch chain store with 1,300 establishments in the Netherlands, Germany, Belgium, France, Luxembourg, Austria and Spain.

History 
It was a kind of supermarket for clothes, and proved to be quite a success, followed soon by the opening of more stores. The distribution centre is still located in Alphen aan den Rijn. Zeeman's house colors are yellow and blue. The logo of the store is a head of a sailor. The stores should radiate simplicity in the interior and in the packaging.

Jan Zeeman retired from the daily management of the company in 1999, which came to be led by former Kijkshop director Paul Schouwenaar. Schouwenaar left the company in September 2006, to be succeeded by Bart Karis from January 2007. Zeeman remained the owner of the company until his death in 2020.

References

External links 

Zeeman website (Dutch version)
Zeeman website (English version)

Multinational companies headquartered in the Netherlands
Retail companies established in 1967
Variety stores
Companies based in South Holland
Retail companies of the Netherlands
Dutch companies established in 1967